Alone with You is a compilation album by American country singer-songwriter Loretta Lynn. It was released in June 1972 on Vocalion and was produced by Owen Bradley. It was only Lynn's fourth compilation released in her career and her second with the Coral label. The album contained a series of tracks recorded early in years at Decca Records.

Background, content and release
Alone with You contained material previously issued on Lynn's studio albums in the early 1960s. These songs were originally recorded in sessions held between 1961 and 1964. These sessions were first produced by Owen Bradley, who would work with Lynn throughout her career. Bradley had signed Lynn to Decca Records in 1961. Her earliest material produced by him contained a mix of covers and originals. The compilation contained a total of eleven tracks. Only two of the album's tracks were originally issued as a singles: "I Walked Away from the Wreck" and "World of Forgotten People." Additional album tracks included covers of Roy Drusky's "Alone with You," Bob Wills' "My Shoes Keep Walking Back to You" and Brenda Lee's "Fool No. 1." Three of the album's songs were composed by Lynn herself, including "World of Forgotten People."

Alone with You was first released in June 1972 via Vocalion Records. It was Lynn's fourth compilation album release. It was originally issued as a vinyl LP, containing six songs on "side one" and five songs on "side two." It was later released in Australia and Germany. The album did not reach any peak positions on any music publication charts, including Billboard. It also did not spawn any singles to radio. The album received 2.5 out of 5 stars in a rating conducted by Allmusic.

Track listing

Personnel
All credits are adapted from the liner notes of Alone with You.

Musical and technical personnel
 Owen Bradley – producer
 Loretta Lynn – lead vocals
 Sandy Nelson – package design

Release history

References

1972 compilation albums
Albums produced by Owen Bradley
Coral Records albums
Loretta Lynn compilation albums